Parmelia hygrophiloides is a species of foliose lichen in the family Parmeliaceae. Found in India, it was described as a new species in 2003 by lichenologists Pradeep Divakar, Dalip Kumar Upreti, and John Elix.

Description
Parmelia hygrophiloides is similar in appearance to the North American species Parmelia hygrophila. The Indian species differs from its counterpart in having dense rhizines with dense squarrose subbranches, and smaller ascospores (10–15 by 6–8 μm compared to 14–16 by 9–12 μm). Parmelia hygrophiloides has been recorded from several areas in Himachal Pradesh, and also grows on coniferous tree trunks. The expected results of standard chemical spot tests are: cortex K+ (yellow); medulla K+ (yellow then dark red), C−, KC−, and P+ (orange). The lichen contains several secondary compounds, including atranorin, chloroatranorin, and salazinic acid.

References

hygrophiloides
Lichen species
Lichens described in 2003
Lichens of India
Taxa named by John Alan Elix
Taxa named by Dalip Kumar Upreti
Taxa named by Pradeep Kumar Divakar